Castilla Province is one of eight provinces in the Arequipa Region of Peru. It was named after Ramón Castilla.

Geography 
The Chila mountain range traverses the province. Other mountains are listed below:

Machuqucha is one of the largest lakes of the province.

Political division
The province is divided into fourteen districts which are, with its capital in parenthesis:

 Andagua (Andagua)
 Aplao (Aplao)
 Ayo (Ayo)
 Chachas (Chachas)
 Chilcaymarca (Chilcaymarca)
 Choco (Choco)
 Huancarqui (Huancarqui)
 Machaguay (Machaguay)
 Orcopampa (Orcopampa)
 Pampacolca (Pampacolca)
 Tipán (Tipán)
 Uñón (Uñón)
 Uraca (Corire)
 Viraco (Viraco)

Ethnic groups 
The province is inhabited by indigenous citizens of Aymara and Quechua descent, as well as European descendants of Spanish settlers. Spanish, is the language which the majority of the population (79.72%) learnt to speak in childhood, 18.52% of the residents started speaking using the Quechua language and 1.51% using Aymara (2007 Peru Census).

See also 
 Antamayu
 Mawk'allaqta

Sources

External links
  Official municipal website

Provinces of the Arequipa Region